Adam's Rib is the second album by Juno-Award-winning Canadian singer-songwriter Melanie Doane. It was first released on September 28, 1998, in Canada on Sony Music Entertainment, and subsequently on Columbia Records on August 24, 1999, in the United States. The album was produced by Rick Neigher.

Track listing
 "Adam's Rib" (Melanie Doane, Rick Neigher) – 3:37
 "Happy Homemaker" (Melanie Doane, Rick Neigher) – 3:51
 "There Is No Beautiful" (Melanie Doane, Rick Neigher) – 3:37
 "Absolutely Happy" (Melanie Doane, David Martin) – 3:27
 "Goliath" (Melanie Doane, Rick Neigher) – 3:51
 "I Can't Take My Eyes Off You" (Melanie Doane, Kevin Fox) – 3:56
 "Waiting for the Tide" (Melanie Doane, Rick Neigher) – 4:09
 "How You Cried" (Melanie Doane) – 4:26
 "The Space Between Us" (Melanie Doane, Creighton Doane, Steve Mayoff) – 5:04
 "Mel's Rock Pile" (Traditional, Melanie Doane, Rick Neigher) – 3:27
 "Good Gifts" (Melanie Doane) – 3:04
 "Sweet Sorrow" (Melanie Doane, David Martin) – 4:04

Song placements
 Brothers and Sisters – "Good Gifts"
 Buffy The Vampire Slayer – "I Can't Take My Eyes Off You"
 Party of Five – "Absolutely Happy", "Waiting For The Tide"
 That's Life – "I Can't Take My Eyes Off You"
 Baywatch Hawaii – "I Can't Take My Eyes Off You"
 Resurrection Blvd – "Absolutely Happy", "Waiting For The Tide", "I Can't Take My Eyes Off You", "How You Cried", "Good Gifts"

Personnel
All information is taken from the liner notes on the CD and from the album review on ARTISTdirect.
 Melanie Doane – vocals, mandolin, violin, piano, bass, programming, background vocals, loops, main performer, arranger
 Rick Neigher – acoustic guitar, bass, arranger, electric guitar, background vocals, engineer, producer
 Tim Pierce – acoustic guitar, electric guitar, Boomerang guitar
 John Shanks – acoustic guitar, electric guitar, E-bow, bass
 Tommy Emmanuel – acoustic guitar
 Kevin Savigar – cello, Wurlitzer piano, Hammond B-3 organ, keyboards, Fender Rhodes piano
 David Raven – drums
 Alex Neigher – drums
 Debra Dobkin – percussion
 Howard Willing – assistant engineer
 Kevin Breit – acoustic guitar
 Jim Hanson – bass
 Gail Marowitz – art direction, design
 Al Lay – assistant engineer
 Michael Daks – photography
 Mike Roth – A&R
 Greg Calbi – mastering
 Marc DeSisto – engineer, mixing
 Kevin Dean – assistant engineer
 Erik Gloege – production coordination

Release history

References

1998 albums
Melanie Doane albums